Ralphi Rosario is an American house musician and founding member of the influential Chicago DJ group Hot Mix 5.

Biography
When Hot Mix 5 was formed in 1981 on radio station WBMX (now WVAZ), Rosario, the youngest member of the group, was still in high school. The Hot Mix 5 went on to become one of the leading forces in the early Chicago house music scene.

Like other members of the group, Rosario eventually branched out into music production and remixing. His first release, made in collaboration with Vince Lawrence, was "Sample That!" in 1986 under the name Bang Orchestra. In 1987, his collaboration with Xaviera Gold, "You Used to Hold Me", became a big hit for Rosario that was subsequently remixed and re-released several times.

Rosario continues to work as a DJ and remixer and has released several albums. He has remixed tracks by artists including INXS, the Shamen, Jomanda, Culture Beat, Gloria Estefan, Deee-Lite, Pet Shop Boys, Madonna, Kylie Minogue, Giorgio Moroder, Michael Bublé, Mariah Carey, Ricky Martin, Kelly Clarkson, Pussycat Dolls, Goldfrapp, Rihanna, Taio Cruz, Katy Perry, and Beyoncé.
On December 1, 2011, it was announced that Rosario, with producing partner Abel Aguilera, received a 2012 Grammy nomination for the Rosabel Club Mix of the Rihanna track "Only Girl (In the World)".

In 2015, his single featuring Julissa Veloz, "La Jungla", gained many positive reviews.

In 2016, his collaboration with Abel Aguilera under their Rosabel alias, gave Rosario another Billboard Dance Chart #1 single with "Livin' for Your Love (Your Love)" (Carrillo Music). This is his sixth #1 single with Aguilera under Rosabel and features the vocals of singer Jeanie Tracy.

In December 2016, Rosario notched his second solo Billboard Dance Chart #1 single for "Button Pusha" which features the vocals of Aneeta Beat. "Button Pusha" is the third charting hit from Rosario's 2 Sides to the Story album. The others charting singles include "La Jungla" featuring Julissa Veloz. and "F*ck Your Boyfriend" featuring Francesca Catalano

In May 2017, his latest collaboration with Abel Aguilera under their Rosabel alias, garnered Rosario another Billboard Dance Chart #1 single with "Anthem of House". This is his seventh #1 single with Aguilera under Rosabel and features the vocals of singer Terri Bjerre.

In 2019, Rosario with Abel Aguilera announced their first ever studio album under their Rosabel alias. The duo named the project The Album. Rosabel's 14 song album featured singers Jeanie Tracy, Terri Bjerre and Tamara Wallace. Rosario and Aguilera worked once again with Rod Carrillo at Carrillo Music to oversee The Album, and shortly after Rosabel announced a tour in support for their new music. The Album was released on April 26, 2019.

Discography

Albums
45 Miles of Nerves Ralphi Rosario (Underground Construction/Afterhours)
2 Sides to the Story- Ralphi Rosario (Carrillo Music)
The Album- Rosabel (Carrillo Music)

Singles
 "You Used to Hold Me"
 "La Jungla" featuring Julissa Veloz
 "F*ck Your Boyfriend" featuring Francesca Catalano
 "Button Pusha" featuring Aneeta Beat

Remixes
 The Absolute featuring Suzanne Palmer - I Believe
 Amy Grant - Find a Way
Ariana Grande featuring Big Sean - Right There
 Assia Ahhatt - If Only Tonight
 B Howard - DSYLM
 Bang Orchestra - Sample That
 Barry Manilow - Copacabana
 Beyoncé - Irreplaceable
 Beyoncé - Grown Woman
 Bonnie Tyler - Two Out of Three Ain't Bad
 BWO - Right Here Right Now
 Celine Dion - Taking Chances
 Cher - A Different Kind of Love Song
 Cyndi Lauper - Same Ol' Story
 Dave Audé feat. Luciana - Something For The Weekend
 Dave Audé feat. Andy Bell - Aftermath (Here We Go)
 David Longoria - Zoon Baloomba
 DJ Fenix & Lisa Williams - California Sun
 Donna Summer - I Got Your Love
 Donna Summer - Fame (The Game)
 Donna Summer - Hot Stuff 2018 (with Erick Ibiza)
 Emii - Mr. Romeo
 Emin Agalarov featuring Nile Rodgers - Boomerang
 Enrique Iglesias - Do You Know? (The Ping Pong Song)
 Garbage - Bleed Like Me
 Giorgio Moroder featuring Kylie Minogue - Right Here, Right Now
 Gloria Estefan - You'll Be Mine (Party Time)
 Gloria Estefan - Tres Deseos
 Gloria Estefan - Hotel Nacional
 Gloria Estefan - Hotel Nacional
 Goldfrapp - Anymore
 Heidi Montag - More Is More
 Ivy Queen - Que Lloren
 Janet Jackson - Feedback
 Janet Jackson - Make Me
 Jeanie Tracy - Can't Take My Eyes Off You
 Jeanie Tracy - Keep The Party Jumpin
 Jeanie Tracy - Cha Cha Heels
 Jennifer Lopez featuring Pitbull - On The Floor
 Jesse McCartney - Leavin
 Jessica Sutta - Show Me
 Joe Jonas - Love Slayer
 Jordan Knight - Give It To You
 Justin Timberlake featuring Beyoncé- Until The End Of Time
 KC and the Sunshine Band - I Love You More
 KC and the Sunshine Band & Bimbo Jones - I'm Feeling You
 KC and the Sunshine Band - We Belong Together
 Kelly Clarkson - Walk Away
 Kelly Rowland feat. David Guetta - Commander
 Kerli - Walking on Air
 Lady Gaga and Ariana Grande - Rain on Me
 Liza Fox - Gimme All (Ring My Bell)
 Madonna - Erotica
 Madonna  - Love Profusion
 Malea - Give
 Mariah Carey - Don't Forget About Us
 Mariah Carey - I Stay in Love
 Mariah Carey - Up Out My Face
 Mariah Carey - Auld Lang Syne (The New Year's Anthem)
 Matchbox 20 - How Far We've Come
 Michael Bublé - Save The Last Dance For Me
 Michael Bublé - Spider-Man Theme
 Michael Bublé - Sway
 Mýa - Movin' On 
 Mylène Farmer & Sting - Stolen Car
 Nelly Furtado featuring Timbaland - Promiscuous
 Noelia - My Everything
 Noelia - Spell featuring Timbaland 
 Pet Shop Boys - Did You See Me Coming
 Pet Shop Boys - To Step Aside
 Princess X - Gimme All (Ring My Bell)
 Pussycat Dolls - Don't Cha
 Pussycat Dolls - When I Grow Up
 Pussycat Dolls - Hush Hush
 Ricky Martin featuring Fat Joe & Amerie - I Don't Care
 Ricky Martin - Pégate
 Ricky Martin - Más/Freak of Nature
 Ricky Martin - Come with Me
 Rihanna featuring David Guetta - Right Now
 Rod Stewart - Da Ya Think I'm Sexy?
 Rod Carrillo - Alegre
 Rod Carrillo & Terri Bjerre - You Got What I Need
 RuPaul - Cha Cha Bitch
 Samantha Mumba - Lately
 Selena Gomez & the Scene - Naturally
 Spice Girls - Spice Up Your Life
 Stevie Nicks - Stand Back
 Tami Chynn featuring Akon - Frozen
 The Tamperer featuring Maya Days - "If You Buy This Record (Your Life Will Be Better)"
 Taio Cruz - Dynamite
 Yenn - Pretty Ugly
 Yoko Ono - Everyman… Everywoman…
 Yoko Ono - Give Me Something
 Yoko Ono - Wouldnit (I'm a Star)
 Yoko Ono - Move on Fast
 Yoko Ono - Talking to the Universe
 Yoko Ono - She Gets Down on Her Knees
 Yoko Ono - I'm Moving On
 Yoko Ono - Hold Me feat. Dave Aude
 Yoko Ono - Walk on Think Ice
 The Wanted - All Time Low Zendaya - Replay (Zendaya song) Katy Perry - Swish Swish Donna Summer - Hotstuff Anngun - What we remember Goldfrapp - Anymore Goldfrapp - Sister Magic''

References

External links

Ralphi Rosario on Discogs

Year of birth missing (living people)
Place of birth missing (living people)
Living people
American DJs
American house musicians
Record producers from Illinois
Club DJs
DJs from Chicago
Remixers
Electronic dance music DJs